Movayyed Hoseini Sadr (born 1970) is an Iranian politician.

Hoseini Sadr was born in Khoy, West Azerbaijan. He is a member of the 8th and 9th Islamic Consultative Assembly from the electorate of Khoy and Chaypareh and chairman of Iran-Turkey Friendship society. Hoseini Sadr won with 78,149 (43.31%) votes.

References

External links
 Hoseini Sadr Website

Academic staff of Azarbaijan Shahid Madani University
People from Khoy
Iranian reformists
Deputies of Khoy and Chaypareh
Living people
1970 births
Members of the 9th Islamic Consultative Assembly
Members of the 8th Islamic Consultative Assembly
Urmia University alumni
Followers of Wilayat fraction members